Tanner Creek is a small tributary of the Willamette River in Portland in the U.S. state of Oregon. Named after a tannery owned by one of the city's founders, it begins in what is now the Sylvan–Highlands neighborhood in the Tualatin Mountains (West Hills) west of downtown. In the 19th century the creek flowed on the surface, running northeast across the city, past what later became Providence Park and into a shallow lake (Couch Lake) and wetlands in what became the Pearl District, bordering the river.

Late in the century, the city began re-routing Tanner Creek and other West Hills streams into combined sewers and filling their former channels and basins to make flat land for homes and businesses. In the 21st century, Tanner Creek is nearly invisible, flowing through a conduit (but not a combined sewer) that empties into the Willamette at Outfall 11, near the Broadway Bridge. Structures along the former course of the creek include Vista Bridge and Tanner Springs Park as well as Providence Park.

Names
Daniel Lownsdale, an early Portland settler and one of Portland's founders, built a tannery along the creek in 1845. The creek was named for the tannery.

Canyon Road, important to Portland's early development, was built along Tanner Creek canyon. First opened in 1849, the road connected Portland to the Tualatin Valley. Lownsdale was the surveyor on an improved version, a plank road, two years later, which began near the future site of the Portland Art Museum.

Couch Lake was named for John H. Couch, another early settler and one of the city's founders. Couch built a home on the west side of the lake.

On the surface
The creek's headwaters lie in what is now the Sylvan–Highlands neighborhood in the Tualatin Mountains (West Hills) west of downtown. The creek flowed down the canyon that now accommodates Southwest Jefferson Street and Canyon Road (U.S. Highway 26). Its course continued across the site of the later Civic Stadium (Providence Park) and down a ravine. Vista Bridge in the Goose Hollow neighborhood crosses a remnant of the Tanner Creek gulch. Pavement markers near Providence Park indicate the creek's former course in that vicinity.

The creek emptied into Couch Lake, near today's Union Station. In 1888, after the Northern Pacific Terminal Company bought the lake, it began filling it with sand and ship ballast.

Underground
Between 1887 and 1891, the City of Portland built a Tanner Creek combined sewer to carry the creek as well as storm runoff and sewage from the West Hills and its homes to the river. In 1904, the sewer collapsed near the Multnomah Athletic Club and flooded property downhill. Investigation of the subsequent sewer reconstruction and repair led to a scandal during the administration of Mayor George Henry Williams and to the firing of the city engineer and chief deputy city engineer on grounds "that they had a part in a general conspiracy to slight the work." The Tanner Creek trunk sewer ran from Southwest Taylor Street to the river near the intersection of Front Avenue and Pettygrove Street.

21st century
Tanner Springs Park, at Northwest 10th Avenue and Marshall Street, commemorates the creek. Opened on land acquired in 2003, it is an "urban waterscape" built on fill that rises  higher than the former lake surface. The wetlands in the park are not connected to Tanner Creek but depend mostly on recycled rainwater.

In 2006, the city completed a pipeline that removed Tanner Creek from the combined sewer system and carried the creek water directly into the Willamette. This was part of a much larger project designed to keep sewage from entering the river during storms.

See also
List of rivers of Oregon
 West Side CSO Tunnel

References

Works cited

Geography of Portland, Oregon
Rivers of Multnomah County, Oregon
Rivers of Oregon
Tributaries of the Willamette River